Jeremiah Jermaine Paul (born July 26, 1979) is an American R&B singer-songwriter. He is the winner of season 2 of American talent competition The Voice. Prior to his stint on The Voice, he provided uncredited vocals on Alicia Keys' Grammy-nominated song "Diary" from her 2003 album, The Diary of Alicia Keys. Paul was a member of the short-lived R&B group 1Accord, which was signed to Shaquille O'Neal's T.W.Is.M. Records.

Early life
Jeremiah Jermaine Paul was born on July 26, 1979, in Harriman, New York, and was raised in Spring Valley, New York, the fifth of 10 children. His father encouraged his involvement in music by "turning their living room into a musical performance area". "It was loaded with instruments—piano, drums and guitars—and some of the kids, including Jermaine, formed a group to perform gospel songs in local churches." By the time he was 12 years old, he began to acquire a reputation for singing at local churches and talent shows with his family. Jermaine joined numerous adult choirs.

At the age of two, Jermaine and his brother moved to Alabama with their grandfather. There, he was introduced to the guitar. He played his step-grandmother's old Gibson guitar at the local church. With some knowledge of the guitar, and the yearning to go back to New York, he wrote his first song.

At the age of 14, he moved back to his birthplace in up-state New York to Harriman (Hudson Valley). There he attended Monroe-Woodbury High School and was introduced to rock and  jazz. While taking guitar lessons he was selected to join the all-state, all-county chorus, and  the classically trained high school voice ensemble.

Music career
At 15, Paul joined a quartet group named 1Accord and signed to basketball star Shaquille O'Neal's label, T.W.Is.M Records. He began writing and producing songs of his own. Paul auditioned for the first season of American Idol but did not receive any callbacks from the producers. He began recording backing vocals for artists such as Alicia Keys, Mary J. Blige, Joss Stone, Blackstreet and Jaguar Wright. He was nominated for a Grammy for the category "Best R&B Performance By A Duo Or Group With Vocals" for "If This World Were Mine" by Alicia Keys featuring Jermaine Paul. The track was from the J Records album So Amazing: An All-Star Tribute to Luther Vandross.

The Voice (2012) 
 
In 2012, he auditioned for the second season of The Voice singing "Complicated" from Avril Lavigne. Two of the four coaches turned their chairs (Blake Shelton and CeeLo Green), with Paul opting to be on Team Blake. He was the eventual winner of the second season.

After The Voice
His winning song, a cover of "I Believe I Can Fly" made it up to #83 on the US Billboard Hot 100. The follow-up, "Soul Man", with his coach Blake Shelton did not break the Hot 100, reaching just #108.

His single "I Believe in This Life" reportedly taken from his forthcoming album premiered on The Voice on November 8, 2012.

Discography

Singles

ADid not enter the Hot 100 but charted on Bubbling Under Hot 100 Singles.

Appearances
Singles as back up vocals

References

External links

20th-century African-American male singers
21st-century American singers
American rhythm and blues singers
Living people
Singers from New York City
The Voice (franchise) winners
1979 births
People from Spring Valley, New York
21st-century American male singers
21st-century African-American male singers